"Future World" is a song and a single made by the German heavy metal band Helloween, from the album Keeper of the Seven Keys: Part I. It is performed frequently by Helloween and Gamma Ray at their concerts.

The single cover is a homage to the comic book anti-hero Judge Dredd.

Single track listing

Personnel
Michael Kiske - vocals
Kai Hansen - lead and rhythm guitars
Michael Weikath - lead and rhythm guitars
Markus Grosskopf - bass guitar
Ingo Schwichtenberg - drums

References

1987 singles
Helloween songs
Songs written by Kai Hansen
1987 songs